Newbury Comics is an American comic book and music retailer based in New England. Newbury Comics began as a comic book vendor on Newbury Street in Boston. The company was founded in 1978 by Massachusetts Institute of Technology students John Brusger and Mike Dreese. Dreese also published Boston Rock, a music tabloid which was active from 1980 to 1987 that focused on punk, new wave and indie bands. There are now 31 stores in six states: four in New Hampshire, two in Rhode Island, one in Maine, two in Connecticut, and sixteen in Massachusetts. On August 20, 2016, Newbury Comics opened its first store outside of New England at the Roosevelt Field Mall in Garden City, New York. This location quickly became the #1 performing store in the chain. Since its opening, five additional locations have been opened in New York bringing its total to six.

Since the late 1980s Newbury Comics has been a vendor of new and used CDs, LPs, singles, and DVDs, and other pop culture–related goods, including comics, manga, posters, T-shirts, trading cards, action figures, buttons, sports merchandise, jewelry, cosmetics, novelties and more.

The chain also had a sister store called Hootenanny which mostly sold punk-style clothing, located one floor below the Newbury Comics in Harvard Square. Hootenanny closed in May 2012, while the flagship Newbury Comics banner was altering its product mix to include more fashion. Newbury Comics stores are gradually shifting from strip centers to mall locations.

Notable employees

 Andy Bonner of the Boston band Piebald worked for years at both the Harvard Square and Alewife locations. The band's "King of the Road" includes the lyrics, "Andy went back to school. He got sick of Newbury Comics."
 Valerie Forgione of Mistle Thrush is the company's Executive Vice President
 Joe Guese, guitarist of The Click Five, worked at the flagship Newbury Comics briefly before joining the band.
 Rob Hamilton and Chris Pearson of Green Magnet School worked at the Framingham store and the warehouse, respectively, when the band was signed to Sub Pop records.
 Aimee Mann worked at the original Newbury Street location before gaining prominence with her band 'Til Tuesday.
 David Shibler worked at the original Newbury Street location while becoming the bass player in the local band the Turbines.
 Jon Syverson, Alexis S.F. Marshall, and Samuel Moorehouse Walker of Daughters have worked at the Providence and North Attleboro locations.
 Chris Pupecki (Doomriders, Black Tail & ex–Cast Iron Hike) worked at the Natick store.
 Johnny Earle, founder of clothing line Johnny Cupcakes, worked at Newbury Comics, where he would secretly sell shirts out of his car on bathroom breaks.
 Jon Strader, guitarist of the band No Trigger, worked at the Shrewsbury location.
 Paul DeGeorge, of Harry and the Potters, worked at various stores, including both Cambridge locations.
 Ian St. Germain, bass player and drummer of Burnt Fur and Tracy Husky, worked at the Harvard Square location.
 Mark McKay, drummer of hardcore punk band Slapshot was a manager of several Newbury Comics stores and worked in the IT department as well as working for Interscope Records.
 Ryan McKenney and Brian Izzi of the band Trap Them, worked at the Salem, NH store.
 Aaron Dalbec of Bane, Only Crime and ex-Converge worked at the Shrewsbury store during the mid-to-late 90s.

Company logo in popular culture
In the movie Hatchet (2006), star Joel Moore spends much of the film in a blood-spattered Newbury Comics T-shirt. In reaction to this Newbury Comics started selling special Hatchet T-shirts like the one in the movie. The "Tooth Face" Logo T-shirt is featured in the second issue of The Bulletproof Coffin comics from Image Comics.

In the fifth and sixth season opening credits for Sabrina, the Teenage Witch, Sabrina, portrayed by Melissa Joan Hart, is seen walking out of the store on Newbury Street.

Store locations 

Connecticut:
 Danbury - Danbury Fair
 Manchester - The Shoppes at Buckland Hills

Maine:
 South Portland - The Maine Mall

Massachusetts:
 Boston - Faneuil Hall Marketplace
 Boston - Newbury Street
 Braintree - South Shore Plaza
 Burlington - Burlington Mall
 Cambridge - CambridgeSide Galleria
 Cambridge - Harvard Square
 Hyannis - Cape Cod Mall
 Kingston - Kingston Collection
 Marlborough - Solomon Pond Mall
 Natick - Natick Mall
 North Attleboro - Emerald Square Mall
 North Dartmouth - Dartmouth Mall
 Northampton 
 Norwood 
 Peabody - Northshore Mall
 Saugus - Square One Mall

New Hampshire:
 Manchester 
 Nashua - Pheasant Lane Mall
 Salem - The Mall at Rockingham Park
 West Lebanon

New York: 
 Albany - Crossgates Mall 
 Garden City - Roosevelt Field Mall
 Lake Grove - Smith Haven Mall
 Staten Island - The Staten Island Mall
 West Nyack - Palisades Center
 White Plains - The Westchester Mall

Rhode Island:
 Providence - Providence Place Mall
 Warwick - Warwick Mall

Source:

References

External links
 
 2008 Interview with Mike Dreese on Well-Rounded Radio

Companies based in Boston
Music retailers of the United States
Privately held companies based in Massachusetts
Retail companies established in 1978